The  (Italian for "Partition of the Alps") is a classification of the  mountain ranges of the Alps, that is primarily used in Italian literature, but also in France and Switzerland. It was devised in 1926.

Structure 

The basic structure is based on the three main divisions. These were further subdivided into 26 sezioni ("sections") and 112 gruppi ("groups").

 The  ("Western Alps") in this classification run from the Bocchetta di Altare/Colle di Cadibona, usually accepted as the boundary between the Alps and the Apennines, to the Col Ferret (just west of the  Great Saint Bernard) between the Aosta Valley and Valais (upper Rhone valley). Its highest peak is Mont Blanc (4,810 m).
 The boundary between the western and central arc of the Alps is the line Ivrea – Aosta Valley – Italian Val Ferret – Col Ferret – Swiss Val Ferret – Martigny-Ville in the knee of Valais – eastern end of Lake Geneva near Montreux/Vevey
 The  ("Central Alps") run from the Col Ferret to the Brenner Pass. Their highest summit is Monte Rosa (4,611 m).
 The eastern section is bounded by the line of the Adige valley (near Verona, Vallagarina, Adige valley i.e.S. to Bolzano) – valley of the Eisack (Eisacktal to Franzensfeste, upper Wipptal valley) – Brenner – valley of the Sill (lower Wipptal) – Innsbruck – Lower Inn Valley as far as Rosenheim
 The Alpi Orientali ("Eastern Alps") run from the Brenner as far as Rijeka (ital. Fiume), including Istrien and Gorski kotar. The Großglockner (3,798 m) is the highest peak of the Eastern Alps.

The term "Central Alps" should not be confused with the Central Alps within the north-to-south division of the Eastern Alps.

History and reception 
This classification of the Alps was compiled in 1926 on the occasion of the IXth Congresso Geografico Italiano and published in the Nomi e limiti delle grandi parti del Sistema Alpino ("Names and Boundaries of the Major Elements of the Alpine System").

The system covered the entirety of the Alps and not just that part of the Alps that lay on Italian soil. In spite of that, the classification is focussed on Italy, because it does not employ the usual bipartite division, and in general the subdivisions usually used in other countries were ignored. It was seen as flawed because it included regions that, according to research, were not part of the Alps.

The following have been cited by Marazzi as basic shortcomings and inconsistencies:
 the inclusion of the Massif des Maures, which does not belong to the Alpine system either tectonically or geologically
 the Monts de Vaucluse, Montagne de Lure and the Luberon Massif were not counted as pre-alps of the Dauphiné in French literature, but as part of  Provence, because they lay within that region. Moreover, the Provence Alps also include the "Prealps of Digne" (Préalpes de Digne), that were placed under Prealpi di Provenza (Provence Prealps) 
 in the Prealpi svizzere (Swiss Prealps) more northerly regions are included that, according to Swiss geographic literature, do not belong to the Alpine region, but to the Central Plateau, as part of the northern Alpine Foreland
 the Alpi Noriche (Noric Alps) cover far too large an area in comparison with the groups given in Austrian literature (rather excessively the Tux Alps, the whole Tauern, the Alps of Styria and Carinthia are incorporated into the Noric Alps)
 the Alpi bavaresi (Bavarian Alps), the Alpi salisburghesi (Salzburg Alps) and the Alpi austriache (Austrian Alps) are based on archaic concepts, the terms are used entirely differently in the German-speaking region
 the inclusion of the Karst in a broad sense and Istria in the Alpine system, which, today, are considered part of the Dinaric Alps

More up to date versions of this system are found in standard works like the Dictionnaire encyclopédique des Alpes (2006) or Il Grande Dizionario Enciclopedico delle Alpi (2007).

Sections and groups of the three Alpine divisions

Table notes

Footnotes

See also 
 Alpine Club classification of the Eastern Alps, Moriggl, 1924, 1984 revision.
 SOIUSA, an unofficial Italian proposal from 2005

References

Literature 
 Comitato Geografico Nazionale Italiano (ed.): Nomi e limiti delle grandi parti del Sistema alpino. In L'Universo. Anno Vili, no. 9, Firenze, 1926.
 G. Bertoglio, G. De Simoni: Partizione delle Alpi (in 220 gruppi). Tipografia Alzani, Pinerolo, 1980.
 AA. VV.: Guida dei monti d'Italia. 60 vols., TCI-CAI, Milan, 1936–97.

Alps
!